STARCO is a Danish run tire and wheel business. The company supply to original equipment manufacturers (OEMs) and distributors; and manufactures steel wheels and plastic rims and tires. The name, STARCO, is an acronym of "Scandinavian Tyre And Rim Company".

It was established in Aarhus, Denmark in 1962, and was owned and operated by Ejlersgaard family. In 2017 the STARCO Group was acquired by the tire manufacturer Kenda. 

The company is headquartered in Brabrand, Aarhus, Denmark. STARCO is a global group of companies with sales, distribution, engineering and wheel-manufacturing operations in more than 12 locations worldwide.

History

1961:Established as P. Ejlersgaard A/S (later STARCO) in Aarhus, Denmark.
1990:STARCO Europe is founded.
1994 - 1998:STARCO buys tire and wheel companies in Netherlands, Germany, Sweden and Great Britain.
2001:East European departments established in Latvia, Lithuania, Estonia and Poland.
2002:Departments in Russia established. Production of rims for agricultural machines moved from Great Britain to Croatia.
2004:STARCO buys tire and wheel companies in Belgium.
2005:STARCO S.R.L. in Italy is founded. STARCO Europe buys into the British company - new group is named STARCO DML Ltd.
2006:STARCO BEL in Belarus and STARCO UKR in Ukraine are founded.
2007:STARCO announces that major manufacturer of dual wheels and rims Gebr. Schaad AG has joined the STARCO Group.
2011:STARCO set up a solid tire manufacturing plant in Sri Lanka
2012: the company celebrates its 50th anniversary; a new central warehouse is open in Winsen (Germany).
2013: STARCO announced the creation of STARCO ZA, a bridgehead for further expansion on the African continent.
2013: Gebrüder Schaad becomes STARCO GS.
2015: Richard Todd appointed STARCO COO.
2016: STARCO chairman and owner Peer Ejlersgaard dies.
2017: STARCO is acquired by Kenda Tire.

Products
Solid Tires (FLT)
Steel Wheel Rims (Agro, Trailers, Industrial and Forest Vehicles)
Dual Wheels (Agro Tractors)
Flex Barrow Wheels (Internal Transport, Horticulture)

Production capacity 
Number of markets (countries): 22 
Number of sales entities: 28 
Number of production sites: 5 
Strategic OEM assembly centers: 6 
Strategic central warehouses: 4

Technology
STARCO implemented the e-coat nanotechnology treatment during the steel wheel production.

Production facilities
STARCO Huanmei (2008)
STARCO Beli Manastir d.o.o. (2002)
STARCO DML Ltd. (2005)
STARCO Lanka (PVT) Ltd. (2011)
STARCO GS (1982)

References

External links
STARCO Homepage (in English and basic European languages)

Tire manufacturers of Denmark
Danish companies established in 1962
Automotive companies established in 1962
Danish brands